Fallschirmjäger was the paratrooper force of the Luftwaffe in Nazi Germany.

Fallschirmjäger may also refer to:
Rapid Forces Division, a division of the Bundeswehr containing airborne and air assault forces
40. Fallschirmjägerbataillon Willi Sänger, the airborne and air assault force of the East German army

See also
Paratrooper